The 1977 Virginia Slims Championships were the sixth season-ending WTA Tour Championships, the annual tennis tournament for the best female tennis players in singles on the 1977 WTA Tour. The singles event consisted of two round robin groups (Gold and Orange) of four players each. The winners of each group played each other in the final and additionally there was a play-off match for third place. The tournament was played on indoor carpet and was held from March 24 to 27 in Madison Square Garden in New York City. First-seeded Chris Evert won the singles event and the accompanying $50,000 first prize money.

Finals

Singles
 Chris Evert defeated  Sue Barker, 2–6, 6–1, 6–1. 
 It was Evert's 6th singles title of the year and the 73rd of her career.

Doubles
 Martina Navratilova /  Betty Stöve defeated  Françoise Dürr /  Virginia Wade, 7–5, 6–3.

See also
 1977 Colgate Series Championships

References

External links
 

WTA Tour Championships
Virginia Slims Championships
Virginia Slims Championships
Virginia Slims Championships
1970s in Manhattan
Virginia Slims Championships
Madison Square Garden
Sports competitions in New York City
Sports in Manhattan
Tennis tournaments in New York City